HMS Black Prince was the third ship of that name to serve with the Royal Navy. She was the world's second ocean-going, iron-hulled, armoured warship, following her sister ship, . For a brief period the two s were the most powerful warships in the world, being virtually impregnable to the naval guns of the time. Rapid advances in naval technology left Black Prince and her sister obsolete within a short time, however, and she spent more time in reserve and training roles than in first-line service.

Black Prince spent her active career with the Channel Fleet and was hulked in 1896, becoming a harbour training ship in Queenstown, Ireland. She was renamed Emerald in 1903 and then Impregnable III in 1910 when she was assigned to the training establishment in Plymouth. The ship was sold for scrap in 1923.

Design and description
The ship displaced . The hull was subdivided by watertight transverse bulkheads into 92 compartments and had a double bottom underneath the engine and boiler rooms.

Propulsion
The Warrior-class ships had one 2-cylinder trunk steam engine made by John Penn and Sons driving a single  propeller. The engine produced a total of  during Black Princes sea trials in September 1862 and the ship had a maximum speed of  under steam alone.

Black Prince could only do  under sail,  slower than her sister .

Armament
The armament of the Warrior-class ships was intended to be 40 smoothbore, muzzle-loading 68-pounder guns, 19 on each side on the main deck and one each fore and aft as chase guns on the upper deck. This was modified during construction to ten rifled 110-pounder breech-loading guns, twenty-six 68-pounders, and four rifled breech-loading 40-pounder guns.

In 1863–1864 the 40-pounder guns were replaced by a heavier version with the same ballistics. All of the guns could fire both solid shot and explosive shells.

Black Prince was rearmed during her 1867–1868 refit with twenty-four 7-inch and four  rifled muzzle-loading guns. The ship also received four 20-pounder breech-loading guns for use as saluting guns. It was credited with the nominal ability to penetrate  armour.

Armour
The ends of the ship were left entirely unprotected, which meant that the steering gear was very vulnerable.

Construction and service

Black Prince was ordered on 6 October 1859 from Robert Napier and Sons in Govan, Glasgow, for the price of £377,954. The ship was laid down on 12 October 1859 and launched 27 February 1861. On 10 March, she ran aground in the River Clyde near Greenock whilst being towed from Govan to Greenock. Her completion was delayed by a drydock accident at Greenock while fitting out, which damaged her masts. She steamed to Spithead in November 1861 with only jury-rigged fore and mizzenmasts. The ship was commissioned in June 1862, but was not completed until 12 September 1862. Black Prince was assigned to the Channel Fleet until 1866, then spent a year as flagship on the Irish coast. Overhauled and rearmed in 1867–1868, she became guardship on the Clyde. The routine of that duty was interrupted in 1869 when she and Warrior towed a large floating drydock from Madeira to Bermuda.

Black Prince was again refitted in 1874–1875, gaining a poop deck, and rejoined the Channel Fleet as flagship of Rear Admiral Sir John Dalrymple-Hay, second-in-command of the fleet. In 1878 Captain H.R.H. Duke of Edinburgh took command and the ship crossed the Atlantic to participate in the installation of a new Governor General of Canada. Upon her return Black Prince was placed in reserve at Devonport, and, reclassified as an armoured cruiser, she was reactivated periodically to take part in annual fleet exercises. Black Prince was hulked in 1896 as a harbour training ship, stationed at Queenstown, and was renamed Emerald in 1903. In 1910 the ship was moved to Plymouth and renamed Impregnable III when she was assigned to the training school HMS Impregnable before she was sold for scrap on 21 February 1923.

Notes

References

External links

 Maritimequest HMS Black Prince Photo Gallery

 

Warrior-class ironclads
Ships built on the River Clyde
1861 ships
Maritime incidents in March 1861
Victorian-era battleships of the United Kingdom
Edward the Black Prince